Archer Mobile was a mobile technology company that offered services such as MMS and SMS messaging with the ability to deliver products like mobile coupons, QR codes, Microsoft tags, and mobile bank statements. The company, based in Seattle, WA, was formed from a merger of iLoop Mobile and Lenco Mobile in 2011. Some of the company's work included infrastructure development in Africa, providing mobile messaging products for clients such as African Bank, Standard Bank, the MTN group, and Vodacom. The company also provided the mobile website for the Obama campaign in the 2008 presidential election.

In 2017, Archer was purchased by IMImobile, which was in turn purchased by Cisco Systems in December 2021.

References

External links
 "VCUpgrade.mobil – Vodacom South Africa's Mobile Upgrade Portal (Multimedia Solutions)".http://www.mmaglobal.com/studies/vcupgrademobi-vodacom-south-africas-mobile-upgrade-portal-multimedia-solutions. 09/17/2012.
 Advantage Business Media. "Lenco Mobile Inc. Sees Growth Opportunities in the United States for MMS Solutions." https://web.archive.org/web/20111017003802/http://www.wirelessdesignmag.com/ShowPR.aspx?PUBCODE=055&ACCT=0000100&ISSUE=1104&RELTYPE=IN&PRODCODE=00000&PRODLETT=BM&CommonCount=0. 09/17/2012.
Parkhurst, Emily. "Small companies go after big business with new smartphone technologies." http://www.bizjournals.com/seattle/print-edition/2012/08/10/small-companies-go-after-big-business.html. Friday, August 10, 2012
"2011 Inc. 5000."http://www.inc.com/inc5000/profile/iloop-mobile. 9/17/2012
Dusan Belic, "iLoop Mobile's SlingShop adds new twist to local deals." http://www.intomobile.com/2011/05/03/iloop-mobiles-slingshop-adds-new-twist-local-deals/. 5/3/2011.
Jon Xavier. "Keeping customer coming round is idea behind iLoop." http://www.bizjournals.com/sanjose/print-edition/2011/04/08/keeping-customers-coming-round-iLoop.html. 4/8/2011.
Katie Deatsch, "iLoop looks to loyalty and location with new mobile deals app." http://www.internetretailer.com/2011/03/16/iloop-looks-loyalty-and-location-new-mobile-deals-app. 3/16/2011.

Software companies based in Seattle
Mobile technology companies
Defunct software companies of the United States
2017 mergers and acquisitions